Apro Castle or A-Pro Castle is a castle in the municipality of Seedorf in the canton of Uri in Switzerland.  It is a Swiss heritage site of national significance.

Part of the castle is the site of Uri's Crystal Museum.

See also
List of castles and fortresses in Switzerland

References

Castles in the canton of Uri
Cultural property of national significance in the canton of Uri